José Carlos Macedo (born 30 June 1972) is a Portuguese paralympic boccia player. He competed at six Paralympic Games from 1996 to 2020, winning five medals including three golds.

References

External links 
Paralympic Games profile

Living people
Sportspeople from Braga
1972 births
Portuguese boccia players
Boccia players at the 1996 Summer Paralympics
Boccia players at the 2000 Summer Paralympics
Boccia players at the 2004 Summer Paralympics
Boccia players at the 2012 Summer Paralympics
Boccia players at the 2016 Summer Paralympics
Boccia players at the 2020 Summer Paralympics
Medalists at the 1996 Summer Paralympics
Medalists at the 2000 Summer Paralympics
Medalists at the 2012 Summer Paralympics
Medalists at the 2016 Summer Paralympics
Paralympic medalists in boccia
Paralympic boccia players of Portugal
Paralympic bronze medalists for Portugal